Christian Lee (Chinese: 李胜龙, Korean: 이승용, born June 21, 1998) is an American mixed martial artist who competes in Featherweight, Lightweight, and Welterweight divisions in ONE Championship. He is the current ONE Welterweight World Champion, as well as the current and two-time ONE Lightweight World Champion. He was also the winner of the 2019 ONE Lightweight World Grand Prix. 

On May 17, 2019, Lee defeated Shinya Aoki to win the ONE Lightweight World Championship as well as becoming the first brother-sister pair of mixed martial arts world champions with his sister Angela Lee holding the ONE Atomweight World Championship.

Background
Born in Vancouver to a Chinese-Singaporean father and a South Korean-born Canadian mother, Lee moved to Hawaii when he was five years old. As both his parents are decorated martial artists, Lee started training in the sport from a young age. Lee's older sister Angela (born July 8, 1996, in Vancouver) is also an MMA fighter with ONE Championship and his younger brother, Adrian (born in Waipahu), also trains in martial arts. Lee's younger sister Victoria, who was also a mixed martial artist signed to ONE, died in 2022 at the age of 18.

At the 2012 USA Pankration national championships, Lee won two national titles and one silver medal. He also won the World Championship in the MMA division at the 2012 World Pangration Athlima Federation Championships.

Mixed martial arts career 
Lee trains out of United MMA in Waipahu, Hawaii and Evolve MMA in Singapore, alongside his teammate and sister, Angela and her husband (and also his brother-in-law), Bruno Pucci, who also competes in ONE Championship's bantamweight division.

Lee made his amateur debut in 2015 at Star Elite Cage Fighting, where he defeated Avery Sanchis via first-round submission.

ONE Championship

ONE Championship

At the age of 17, Lee signed with ONE Championship and made his promotional debut at ONE Championship: Spirit of Champions on December 11, 2015, earning his first career win with a 29-second TKO of David Meak.

Lee followed that up by submitting Mahmoud Deab Mohamed in the first round with a kimura at ONE Championship: Clash Of Heroes on January 29, 2016.

On March 18, 2016, he earned another first-round win against Anthony Engelen at ONE Championship: Union of the Warriors with a TKO stoppage by punches and elbow

At ONE Championship: Ascent To Power on May 6, 2016, Lee improved to 4-0 when he submitted Cary Bullos in the opening round with a brabo choke.

Lee continued his streak of first-round finishes when he stopped Rocky Batolbatol by TKO at ONE Championship: Kingdom Of Champions on May 27, 2016.

In his next match on August 13, 2016, Lee suffered his first professional defeat to rising featherweight Martin Nguyen at ONE Championship: Heroes of the World, losing in the first-round via a guillotine choke.

Lee rebounded by defeating Wan Jianping with a first-round TKO at ONE Championship: Kings of Destiny on April 21, 2017.

For the first time in his career, Lee was pushed to three rounds before finally submitting Keanu Subba with an armbar at ONE Championship: Quest for Greatness on August 18, 2017.

On December 9, 2017, at ONE Championship: Warriors of the World, Lee defeated former ONE Lightweight World Champion Kotetsu Boku in the first round by TKO.

Lee submitted Kazunori Yokota in the second round at ONE Championship: Visions of Victory on March 9, 2018 to clinch his fourth straight win.

ONE Featherweight Championship contender

After his strong run of performances, Lee would earn a title shot against ONE Featherweight World Champion Martin Nguyen at ONE Championship: Unstoppable Dreams on 18 May 2018. Following a five-round back-and-forth battle, Lee would lose by a narrow split-decision, marking his second defeat to the Vietnamese-Australian featherweight.

Lee dropped another match against Filipino Edward Kelly at ONE Championship: Beyond the Horizon on September 8, 2018 after he was disqualified under the promotion's global martial art ruleset. During his takedown of Kelly, Lee was judged to have used an illegal belly-to-back suplex that caused Kelly to land on his head and neck.

He got back on the win sheet against former Pancrase Lightweight Champion Kazuki Tokudome in a 73 kg catchweight bout at ONE Championship: Heart of the Lion on 9 November 2018, defeating the Japanese fighter in the first-round via TKO. The match was added to the card on short notice after his sister Angela Lee, who was scheduled to face Xiong Jing Nan for the ONE Strawweight Championship, was forced to pull out due to a back injury.

In his anticipated rematch against Edward Kelly at ONE Championship: Eternal Glory on January 19, 2019, Lee stopped Kelly via first-round TKO and pushed his overall record to 14–3.

ONE Lightweight Champion

Lee agreed to an open challenge for the title from ONE Lightweight World Champion Shinya Aoki, issued in March 2019 just after Aoki had won the Lightweight title himself. Lee, a featherweight, would be moving up a division in order to challenge for the belt. On May 17, 2019, at ONE Championship: Enter The Dragon, Lee survived an armbar submission attempt to upset the Japanese grappling legend in the second-round via TKO finish and win his first mixed martial arts world title. His victory also made him the youngest ever male mixed martial arts world champion, as well as the first ever brother-sister pair of world champions in the history of mixed martial arts, with his sister Angela Lee holding the ONE Atomweight Championship.

On September 26, 2019, ONE Championship Chairman and founder Chatri Sityodtong announced that Lee had accepted an offer to serve as a late-notice replacement for the injured Eddie Alvarez in the ONE Lightweight World Grand Prix Championship Final. The match would be against Turkish finalist Saygid Guseyn Arslanaliev at ONE Championship: Century Part I on 13 October 2019, after initial replacement Filipino fighter Edouard Folayang had trouble with visa issues. The late insertion into the event would allow Lee to fight on the same card as his sister Angela Lee, who was defending her Atomweight title that night. Lee would go on to win by unanimous decision, earning the ONE Lightweight Word Grand Prix Championship.

Lee defended his ONE Lightweight Championship against Iuri Lapicus at ONE Championship: Inside the Matrix on October 30, 2020. After surviving an initial barrage, he won the fight in the first round by TKO via punches on the ground.

Lee next defended his ONE Lightweight Championship against Timofey Nastyukhin at ONE on TNT 2 on April 14, 2021. He won the fight via TKO just over a minute into the first round.

Lee was scheduled to defend his ONE Lightweight World Championship against Ok Rae Yoon at ONE Championship: Revolution on September 24, 2021. Lee lost the fight by a unanimous decision. Due to the controversial nature of the decision, it was reviewed by the ONE Competition Committee which ultimately upheld the result.

Lee rematched Ok Rae Yoon on August 26, 2022 at ONE 160. Lee recaptured the title after dropping Yoon in the second round and finishing him on the ground with knees. This win earned him the Performance of the Night award.

ONE Welterweight Champion

Lee moved up to 185 lbs(and debuted at Welterweight) and challenged for the ONE Welterweight World Championship against reigning champion Kiamrian Abbasov on November 18, 2022 at ONE on Prime Video 4. At weigh-ins, Abbasov missed weight, coming in at 186.25 lbs, 1.25 pounds over the limit. Abbasov was stripped of the title and the bout proceeded at a catchweight with only Lee being able to win the title. He won the fight via technical knockout in the fourth round. This win earned him the Performance of the Night award.

Personal life
Lee holds American and Canadian citizenship.

Lee and his wife Katie are expecting their first child, due in April 2021.

Lee's older sister is fellow ONE FC World Champion Angela Lee, and his younger sister Victoria Lee made her successful professional MMA debut at the age of 16 on February 26, 2021.

On January 7, 2023, it was revealed by his sister Angela that Victoria had died on December 26, 2022 at the age of 18.

Championships and accomplishments

Pankration 

 World Pangration Athlima Federation (WPAF) World Championship
2012 Agon Men, Cadets, -60 kg — Gold

USA Pankration National Championship
2012 Youth, Age 12–13, -153 lb — Silver

USFL Pankration Championship
2013 Junior, Age 14–17, -140 lb — Gold

FILA Grappling World Championship
2013 Boys, Age 14–15, -66 kg — Gold

Grappling 

FILA Grappling World Championship
2013 Brazilian Jiu-Jitsu, Boys, Age 14–15, -66 kg — Gold

FILA Grappling World Championship
2013 Submission Wrestling, Boys, Age 14–15, -66 kg — Gold

Mixed martial arts 

 ONE Championship
ONE Welterweight World Championship (One time, current)
 ONE Lightweight World Championship (Two times, current)
Two successful title defenses
 2019 ONE Lightweight World Grand Prix Tournament Winner
Performance of the Night (Two time) 
FILA Grappling World Championship
2013 Amateur MMA, Boys, Age 14–15, -66 kg — Gold

Mixed martial arts record 

|Win
|align=center|17–4
|Kiamrian Abbasov 
|TKO (elbows and punches) 
|ONE on Prime Video 4
|
|align=center|4
|align=center|4:20
|Kallang, Singapore
|
|-
|Win
|align=center|16–4
|Ok Rae Yoon 
|TKO (knees)
|ONE 160
|
|align=center|2
|align=center|1:00
|Kallang, Singapore
|
|-
| Loss
| align=center|15–4
| Ok Rae Yoon 
| Decision (unanimous) 
| ONE Championship: Revolution
| 
| align=center|5	
| align=center|5:00
|Kallang, Singapore
|| 
|-
| Win
| align=center|15–3
| Timofey Nastyukhin
| TKO (punches)
| ONE on TNT 2
| 
| align=center|1
| align=center|1:13
| Kallang, Singapore
| 
|-
| Win
| align=center|14–3
| Iuri Lapicus
| TKO (punches)
| ONE Championship: Inside the Matrix
| 
| align=center|1
| align=center|2:19
| Kallang, Singapore
| 
|-
| Win
| align=center|13–3
| Saygid Guseyn Arslanaliev
| Decision (unanimous)
| ONE Championship: Century Part 1
| 
| align=center|3
| align=center|5:00
| Tokyo, Japan
| 
|-
| Win
| align=center| 12–3
| Shinya Aoki
| TKO (punches)
| ONE Championship: Enter The Dragon
| |
| align=center| 2
| align=center| 0:51
| Kallang, Singapore
| 
|-
| Win
| align=center| 11–3
| Edward Kelly
| TKO (punches)
| ONE Championship: Eternal Glory
| 
| align=center| 1
| align=center| 2:53
| Jakarta, Indonesia
|  
|-
| Win
| align=center| 10–3
| Kazuki Tokudome
| TKO (punches)
| ONE Championship: Heart of the Lion
| 
| align=center| 1
| align=center| 3:07
| Kallang, Singapore
| 
|-
| Loss
| align=center| 9–3
| Edward Kelly
| DQ (illegal suplex)
| ONE Championship: Beyond the Horizon
| 
| align=center| 1
| align=center| 2:19
| Shanghai, China
| 
|-
| Loss
| align=center| 9–2
| Martin Nguyen
| Decision (split)
| ONE Championship: Unstoppable Dreams
| 
| align=center| 5
| align=center| 5:00
| Kallang, Singapore
| 
|-
| Win
| align=center| 9–1
| Kazunori Yokota
| Submission (guillotine choke)
| ONE Championship: Visions of Victory
| 
| align=center| 2
| align=center| 4:34
| Kuala Lumpur, Malaysia
| 
|-
| Win
| align=center| 8–1
| Kotetsu Boku
| TKO (punches)
| ONE Championship: Warriors of the World
| 
| align=center| 1
| align=center| 3:24
| Bangkok, Thailand
|  
|-
| Win
| align=center| 7–1
| Keanu Subba
| Submission (armbar)
| ONE Championship: Quest for Greatness
| 
| align=center| 3
| align=center| 1:11
| Kuala Lumpur, Malaysia
| 
|-
| Win
| align=center| 6–1
| Jianping Wan
| TKO (punches)
| ONE Championship: Kings Of Destiny
| 
| align=center| 1
| align=center| 4:50
| Manila, Philippines
| 
|-
| Loss
| align=center| 5–1
| Martin Nguyen
| Submission (guillotine choke)
| ONE Championship: Heroes of the World
| 
| align=center| 1
| align=center| 4:30
| Macau, China
| 
|-
| Win
| align=center| 5–0
| Rocky Batolbatol
| TKO (punches)
| ONE Championship: Kingdom of Champions
| 
| align=center| 1
| align=center| 2:14
| Bangkok, Thailand
| 
|-
| Win
| align=center| 4–0
| Cary Bullos
| Submission (brabo choke)
| ONE Championship: Ascent to Power
| 
| align=center| 1
| align=center| 2:07
| Kallang, Singapore
| 
|-
| Win
| align=center| 3–0
| Anthony Engelen
| TKO (punches and elbows)
| ONE Championship: Union of Warriors
| 
| align=center| 1
| align=center| 4:14
| Yangon, Myanmar
| 
|-
| Win
| align=center| 2–0
| Mahmoud Deab Mohamed
| Submission (kimura)
| ONE Championship: Clash of Heroes
| 
| align=center| 1
| align=center| 2:20
| Kuala Lumpur, Malaysia
| 
|-
| Win
| align=center| 1–0
| David Meak
| TKO (punches)
| ONE Championship: Spirit of Champions
| 
| align=center| 1
| align=center| 0:29
| Manila, Philippines
| 
|-

See also
List of current ONE fighters

Notes

References

External links
 Christian Lee at ONE
 
 
 

1998 births
Living people
Featherweight mixed martial artists
Lightweight mixed martial artists
Canadian male mixed martial artists
Canadian practitioners of Brazilian jiu-jitsu
Canadian taekwondo practitioners
Canadian sportspeople of Chinese descent
Canadian people of Korean descent
Canadian people of Singaporean descent
Sportspeople from Vancouver
American male mixed martial artists
American practitioners of Brazilian jiu-jitsu
American male taekwondo practitioners
American people of Chinese descent
American people of Korean descent
American people of Singaporean descent
Mixed martial artists from Hawaii
Mixed martial artists utilizing taekwondo
Mixed martial artists utilizing Muay Thai
Mixed martial artists utilizing pankration
Mixed martial artists utilizing wrestling
Mixed martial artists utilizing Brazilian jiu-jitsu
Sportspeople from Hawaii
Canadian expatriate sportspeople in the United States
People awarded a black belt in Brazilian jiu-jitsu
ONE Championship champions